Bandaru  is a village in the southern state of Karnataka, India. It is located in the Belthangady taluk of Dakshina Kannada district in Karnataka.

Description 

 information the location code or village code of Bandaru village is 617672. Bandaru village is located in Beltangady Tehsil of Dakshina Kannada district in Karnataka, India. It is situated 26 km away from sub-district headquarter Beltangady and 70 km away from district headquarter Mangaluru. As per 2009 stats, Bandaru village is itself a gram panchayat.

The total geographical area of village is 2044.65 hectares. Bandaru has a total population of 4,011 peoples. There are about 802 houses in Bandaru village. Beltangady is nearest town to Bandaru which is approximately 26 km away.

Schools and colleges
There are four primary schools and a high school.
 Government Primary School, Bandaru

It was established in 1954 and it is managed by the Karnataka Department of Education. It is located in Bandaru. It is located in Belthangady block of Dakshina Kannada district of Karnataka. The school consists of Grades from 1 to 8.

 Government High School, Perlabipady
 Government Primary School, Mairoldka
 Government Primary School, Perlabaipady
 Government Primary School, Kuntalpalke

See also 
Belthangady
Ujire
Dharmasthala

References

Villages in Dakshina Kannada district